Ana Maria Sălăgean (née Roth; born 27 March 1937) is a Romanian athlete. She competed in the women's shot put at the 1964 Summer Olympics.

References

1937 births
Living people
Athletes (track and field) at the 1964 Summer Olympics
Romanian female shot putters
Olympic athletes of Romania
Place of birth missing (living people)
Universiade medalists in athletics (track and field)
Universiade bronze medalists for Romania